Tony West (born 7 July 1972) is an English former professional darts player.

Darts career

BDO career

Winmau World Masters
West's biggest successes have come at the Winmau World Masters. He reached the final in 2002 but was beaten by 7-4 by Mark Dudbridge. In 2003, he made the semi-finals where he played Ted Hankey. Hankey went 5–4 in front in their best of 11 match, and started celebrating after making a high outshot to win the set. However, this proved premature as West recovered to win the match 6–5. In the final, West played Raymond van Barneveld, who had won the year's three preceding Grand Slam events and was looking to complete his set. It looked likely as van Barneveld took an early lead, but West improved his form and took it to a deciding set. At 5–4 to West in the set they were within one leg of playing a sudden-death leg, but West managed to break van Barneveld's throw and win the title.

BDO World Championship
West reached the last 16 of the 2004 BDO World Championship, where he lost to eventual champion Andy Fordham.

Since 2004, West's form has slumped somewhat and he failed to qualify for the 2007, 2008 and 2009 World Championships. He did however qualify for the 2010 tournament, reaching the second round before losing to Dave Chisnall. In 2011 he lost in the first round to champion Martin Adams, while the following year he lost at the same stage to Belgian Geert De Vos.

Other events
West has won one Open event, the Portland Open in 2004, and one pairs Open event, also at the Portland Open in 2006.

PDC career
In January 2012, he entered the Professional Darts Corporation Pro Tour 'Q School' qualifying tournament, one of several BDO players to do so, including his brother Steve and Dean Winstanley. On the first day of 'Q School', West beat Keegan Brown 6–4 to gain a 2012 PDC ProTour Card, gaining him automatic access to all UK Open qualifiers, Players Championship and European Tour events. In his first 19 events on the PDC tour West's best finishes were two last 32 exits in Pro Tour events. 
In August, he beat Daniel Day and Jim Walker in the UK Qualifier for the European Tour Event 4, and in the first round in Stuttgart, West enjoyed a 6–5 victory over world number 11 Justin Pipe in the first round. He played fellow qualifier Terry Temple in round two and won 6–4, before claiming the biggest win of his PDC career to date when he defeated Terry Jenkins 6–4 to advance to his first ever PDC quarter-final. He played reigning two-time world champion Adrian Lewis and lost 3–6. West also qualified for the fifth European Tour Event of the year, the Dutch Darts Masters, and was narrowly beaten 5–6 by Brendan Dolan in the first round. He finished 52nd on the 2012 ProTour Order of Merit, just £400 short of claiming one of the sixteen spots awarded to the highest non-qualified players for the 2013 World Championship.

West lost 5–3 to Jake Pennington in the first round of the 2013 UK Open. He only played in six more events in the rest of the year and finished it outside the top 64 meaning he needed to enter Q School to regain his place. However, the Netherlands-based West decided not to register for the event and instead concentrated on European Tour tournaments in 2014. He entered three qualifiers and failed to reach the main event in all of them.

West qualified for the 2016 European Darts Grand Prix, his first European tour event in three years, and beat Jeffrey de Graaf 6–2, before losing 6–3 to Michael Smith. He also played in the German Darts Championship and met brother Steve in the first round, who averaged 109.98 in a 6–0 whitewash.

World Championship results

BDO

 2004: Second round: (lost to Andy Fordham 0–3)
 2005: Second round: (lost to Robert Thornton 0–3)
 2006: First round: (lost to Tony O'Shea 1–3)
 2010: Second round: (lost to Dave Chisnall 2–4)
 2011: First round: (lost to Martin Adams1–3)
 2012: First round: (lost to Geert De Vos 1–3)

Performance timeline

References

External links
Tony West profile and stats Darts Database

1972 births
Living people
People from Waltham Abbey, Essex
English darts players
Professional Darts Corporation former tour card holders
British Darts Organisation players